Jenee Lowe (born September 5, 1955) is a former American Democrat politician from Kansas City, Missouri, who served in the Missouri House of Representatives.

Born in Kansas City, Missouri, she attended Ruskin High School, Avila College, and Longview Community College.

References

1955 births
20th-century American politicians
21st-century American politicians
20th-century American women politicians
21st-century American women politicians
Democratic Party members of the Missouri House of Representatives
Living people
Women state legislators in Missouri